was a town located in Monbetsu District, Abashiri Subprefecture (now Okhotsk Subprefecture), Hokkaido, Japan.

As of 2007, the town has an estimated population of 5,695 and a population density of 36.3 persons per km2. The total area is 161.39 km2.

On October 1, 2009, Kamiyūbetsu was merged into the town of Yūbetsu; both are in Monbetsu District, Okhotsk Subprefecture.

References

External links

 Yūbetsu official website 

Dissolved municipalities of Hokkaido